Star sapphire or Star Sapphire may refer to:

 Star sapphire, a type of sapphire gemstone that exhibits a star-like reflection of light (an asterism)
 The Armstrong Siddeley Star Sapphire, a British car manufactured from 1958 to 1960
 Star Sapphire (DC Comics character), the name of several fictional supervillains in DC Comics publications
 Star Sapphire, a fictional character from the Touhou Project series of video games
 Star Sapphire, Forbidden Planet Robby the Robot - "Star Sapphires take a week to crystalize properly."